Ines Obradović (born 23 March 1998) is a Montenegrin footballer who plays as a goalkeeper and has appeared for the Montenegro women's national team.

Career
Obradović has been capped for the Montenegro national team, appearing for the team during the 2019 FIFA Women's World Cup qualifying cycle.

References

External links
 
 
 

1998 births
Living people
Montenegrin women's footballers
Montenegro women's international footballers
Women's association football goalkeepers